Savvas Kokkinides  served as the International Commissioner of the Cyprus Scouts Association.

In 1980, Kokkinides was awarded the 141st Bronze Wolf, the only distinction of the World Organization of the Scout Movement, awarded by the World Scout Committee for exceptional services to world Scouting.

References

External links

complete list

Recipients of the Bronze Wolf Award
Year of birth missing
Scouting and Guiding in Cyprus